Kelita Zupancic (born May 9, 1990, in Whitby, Ontario) is a judoka from Canada. Zupancic won gold medals for Canada at the 2010, 2013 and 2015 Pan Am judo championships.

Biography
Zupancic was born in Whitby which is a town in the Toronto metro area. She is of Slovenian origin. Her father Eddie is a judo coach and trainer.

She is member of the Formokan Judo Club and she has been training at the National Training Centre in Montreal under the watchful eyes of National Coach Nicolas Gill and Hiroshi Namakura. Through some discussion with Hiroshi Namakura, it was felt that the time was right for Zupancic to train in Japan. Hiroshi Namakura contacted Yoshiyuki Matsuoka who is a former Olympic Champion and head coach at a private women's judo club which is sponsored by the company Komatsu Limited. He suggested to Zupancic that she should go to train at the Komatsu club. Zupancic agreed and Hiroshi Namakura arranged the visit.

In January 2010, Zupancic visited the club for nearly one month. She endured very intense training with some of the top Japanese women in the world. Also coaching at Komatsu club is Kazuhiko Tokuno (Japan National Female Coach) and Mayumi Katsura, both former world class competitors. After her visit, Zupancic went on to win medals at a World Cup in Hungary, and a Grand Prix in Germany and then a gold at the 2010 Pan American Judo Championships in El Salvador.

At the Formokan Judo Club's 35th year reunion (2010), Zupancic announced that she has been offered a position on the Komatsu club Judo team. According to Hiroshi Namakura, one foreign judoka is selected per year and Zupancic was recognized. She was offered a one-year contract to train with the team, work for Komatsu club and compete for them at team events. She competed at the 2012 Summer Olympics, losing to eventual gold winner Lucie Décosse in the second round. At the 2014 World Judo Championships, she finished in 5th place. She has been ranked number one to three in the world between 2012 and 2015.

In June 2016, she was named to Canada's Olympic team.  At the 2016 Olympics, she beat Esther Stam in the second round, before losing to Haruka Tachimoto, the eventual champion, in the quarterfinals.  Because Tachimoto reached the final, Zupancic was entered into the repechage.  In the repechage, she lost to Bernadette Graf.

See also

Judo in Ontario
Judo in Canada
List of Canadian judoka

References

External links
 Judoinside
 Facebook

1990 births
Living people
Canadian female judoka
Judoka at the 2012 Summer Olympics
Olympic judoka of Canada
Sportspeople from Whitby, Ontario
Judoka at the 2011 Pan American Games
Judoka at the 2015 Pan American Games
Pan American Games gold medalists for Canada
Judoka at the 2016 Summer Olympics
Pan American Games medalists in judo
Canadian people of Slovenian descent
Medalists at the 2015 Pan American Games